Francis Robinson (born 1944) is an academic.

Francis Robinson may also refer to:
Francis P. Robinson (1906–1983), educational psychologist
USS Francis M. Robinson (DE-220), U.S. Navy destroyer
Francis Robinson (1910–1980), one-time assistant manager and television host for the Metropolitan Opera
Francis Robinson, character in Swiss Family Robinson

See also
Frances Robinson (disambiguation)
Frank Robinson (disambiguation)